Frédéric Durieux (born 27 February 1959, Paris) is a French composer of orchestral, vocal, and chamber works. He is a professor of composition at the Paris Conservatoire National Supérieur.

References

External links

Living composers project page
Personal website
Biographical sketch and description of aesthetic

1959 births
Living people
20th-century classical composers
21st-century classical composers
French classical composers
French male classical composers
20th-century French composers
21st-century French composers
20th-century French male musicians
21st-century French male musicians